William W. Wheaton (April 5, 1833 – November 11, 1891) was a wholesale grocer, mayor of Detroit, Michigan, chair of the Michigan Democratic State Convention, and state representative.

Biography
William W. Wheaton was born in New Haven, Connecticut on April 5, 1833, the son of John and Orit Johnson Wheaton.  His father died in 1844, leaving the younger Wheaton to care for his mother.   He attended school in New Haven and Hartford, Connecticut, and at the age of 16 began working at the wholesale establishment of Charles H. Northam & Co.

After gaining some experience at Northam & Co. and rising to the position of bookkeeper and confidential clerk, Wheaton moved to Detroit in 1853 and joined Moore, Foote, and Co., wholesale grocers.  In 1855, he became the junior partner in Farrand & Wheaton, wholesale grocer and druggist, and in 1859 when Farrand & Wheaton was dissolved, he struck out on his own and formed Wheaton & Co.  Over the next few years, Wheaton took on different partners, becoming Wheaton & Peek in 1862, WHeaton, Leonard, and Burr in 1863, and Wheaton & Poppleton in 1869.  In 1873, he became treasurer of the Marquette & Pacific Rolling Mill Company.

In 1866, Wheaton ran for state Senate, and lost by only 12 votes. He later ran for mayor of Detroit, and was elected twice, serving two two-year terms from 1868 - 1871.  He also served as chairman of the Democratic State Convention, although the nomination of Horace Greeley for president later soured him on politics.  However, Wheaton returned to politics, and was elected state representative in 1889.

Wheaton married Maria Lavinia Ackerman; the couple had two daughters: Ida (born 1856) and Maria (born 1859).

William W. Wheaton died  at Harper Hospital on November 11, 1891.

References

1833 births
1891 deaths
Members of the Michigan House of Representatives
Mayors of Detroit
Businesspeople from New Haven, Connecticut
19th-century American politicians
19th-century American businesspeople